The East Central Tigers (also ECU Tigers) are the athletic teams that represent East Central University, located in Ada, Oklahoma, in NCAA Division II intercollegiate sports. The Tigers compete as members of the Great American Conference for all 11 varsity sports.

Varsity teams

List of teams

Men's sports
 Baseball
 Basketball
 Cross Country
 Football
 Track and Field

Women's sports
 Basketball
 Cross Country
 Soccer
 Softball
 Track and Field
 Volleyball

In March 2016, the school announced that it was suspending golf and tennis due to budget cuts by the state of Oklahoma.

Individual sports

Football

In 1993, the Tigers won the NAIA national football championship against Glenville State 4–35 at ECU's Norris Field. In 2011 won the inaugural GAC regular season championship and the Conference tournament championship.

Basketball

For three seasons — from 1928 through 1931, when the school was known as Ada Teachers College — the Tigers men's basketball team played at a major competitive level comparable to what since 1973 would be considered NCAA Division I. During these years, Tigers guard Bart Carlton was a two-time All-American in 1930 and 1931. In 1944, the Helms Athletic Foundation retroactively selected him as the Helms Foundation College Basketball Player of the Year for the 1930–31 NCAA men's basketball season.

On November 20, 2008, the Tigers men's basketball team and Texas Tech set school records for points scored in a game in a 167–115 Tigers loss to the Red Raiders.

Alumni
 Harry "The Cat" Brecheen, former baseball player
 Bart Carlton, Helms Foundation College Basketball Player of the Year and DX-Oilers national championship Amateur Athletic Union basketball player
 Mark Gastineau, professional football player
 Todd Graham, University of Hawaii head football coach
 Christopher Lane, baseball player
 Dewey McClain, football player and congressman
 Gil Morgan, professional golfer
 Red Phillips
 Brad Calip, college football hall-of-famer
 Cliff Thrift, former San Diego Chargers, Chicago Bears and Los Angeles Rams professional football player
 Lloyd Waner, baseball hall-of-famer
 Paul Waner, baseball hall-of-famer
  Armonty Bryant, professional football player
  Caleb Holley, professional football player
 David Moore, professional football player

References

External links